Rinky Hijikata and Jason Kubler defeated Hugo Nys and Jan Zieliński in the final, 6–4, 7–6(7–4) to win the men's doubles tennis title at the 2023 Australian Open. Awarded a wildcard into the tournament, Hijikata and Kubler saved a match point en route to the title, in their third round match against Tomislav Brkić and Gonzalo Escobar. Nys became the first ever Monegasque player to reach the semifinal and final of a major.

Thanasi Kokkinakis and Nick Kyrgios were the reigning champions, but the pair withdrew due to Kyrgios' knee injury.

Wesley Koolhof and Neal Skupski will regain the ATP No. 1 doubles ranking courtesy of making the quarterfinals and other contenders losing in the earlier rounds. Rajeev Ram, Mate Pavić, Marcelo Arévalo and Jean-Julien Rojer were also in contention for the top ranking at the beginning of the tournament.

Rojer was vying to complete the Career Grand Slam in men's doubles, but lost in the quarterfinals to Jérémy Chardy and Fabrice Martin, partnering Arévalo.

Seeds

Draw

Finals

Top half

Section 1

Section 2

Bottom half

Section 3

Section 4

Other entry information

Wild cards

Alternates

Withdrawals

References

External links 
 Draw

Men's Doubles
Australian Open - Men's Doubles
2023